Malipo County is under the administration of the Wenshan Zhuang and Miao Autonomous Prefecture, in the southeast of Yunnan province, China, bordering Ha Giang Province to the southeast.

Administrative divisions
In the present, Malipo County has 4 towns, 6 townships and 1 ethnic township. 
4 towns

6 townships

1 ethnic township
 Mengdong Yao

Ethnic groups
The following list of ethnic groups and subgroups, and their respective distributions, is from the Malipo County Gazetteer (2000).

Han: 152,407 people (1990)
Zhuang: 30,706 people (1990)
Miao: 41,620 people (1990)
White Miao 白苗 (autonym: Mengdou 蒙逗): Donggan, Xinzhai, Majie, Tiechang
Flowery Miao 花苗 (autonyms: Mengcai 蒙彩, Mengleng 蒙冷, Mengshe 蒙舍): Malipo Town, Daping, Mengdong, Nanwenhe, Xiajinchang, Babu, Liuhe, Yangwan
Black Miao 黑苗 (autonym: Mengduo 蒙夺): Dongyou 东油, Jiangdong 江东 of Babu Township 八布乡
Green Miao 青苗 (autonym: Mengzhao 蒙诏): Chonggan 铳干, Yangwan Township 杨万乡 and Tanshan 炭山, Babu Township 八布乡
Yao: 17,925 people (1990)
Landian [Blue Indigo] Yao 蓝靛瑶 (autonyms: Men 门, Jinmen 金门)
Horned Yao 角瑶 (autonym: You Mian 尤棉)
Yi: 5,212 people (1990)
White Luo 白倮, also Hairy Lolo 毛倮倮 due to their long hair (autonym: Muyasang 木亚桑): Xinzhai 新寨 and Chengzhai 城寨 villages of Xinzhai Township 新寨乡; entered Malipo County during the Qing Dynasty
Flowery Luo 花倮, formerly Head-Cutting Luo 砍头倮 (autonyms: Muji 木吉, Egao 呃稿): Mabeng 马崩, Yongli 永利, and Zhelong 者挖 villages of Donggan Township 董干镇; entered the Donggan area at the end of the Ming Dynasty and beginning of the Qing Dynasty. They are related to the Flower Lolo people of Ha Giang, Vietnam. 
Mengwu 孟武: Mada Village 马达, Daping Township 大坪镇; entered Malipo County at the end of the Ming Dynasty and beginning of the Qing Dynasty. 
Pubiao 普标, historically Woni 窝泥, and Pubiao Lolo 普标倮倮 during the Republic of China era (autonym: Geibiao 给标): Punong 普弄, Pufeng 普峰, Longlong 竜/龙龙, and other villages. Their ancestors were reported to have migrated from a location called Dayandong 大岩洞 in Pumei 普梅 or (also called Puyang 普阳 or ).
Laji 拉基: Maoping 茅坪, Yuhuang 玉皇; Nanwenhe Township 南温河乡, where they were one of the earliest inhabitants; entered Malipo County at the end of the Ming Dynasty and beginning of the Qing Dynasty from a place called Amizhou 阿迷州
Dai: 2,664 people (1990), mostly in Nanwenhe Township 南温河乡
Gelao: 1,166 people (1990); entered Malipo County at the end of the Ming Dynasty and beginning of the Qing Dynasty from Guizhou and Guangnan County
White Gelao 白仡佬
Flowery Gelao 花仡佬
Green/Bamboo Gelao 青/箐仡佬
Mongol: 1,211 people (1990)

Climate

Tourism
 One major tourist attraction is the neolithic rock art above Malipo itself, apparently known as the 'Great King' site for the two dominant figures at the center of the artwork. It is said to be over 4000 years old.

Transport
Nearest airport: Wenshan Airport

References

External links

Malipo County Official website
Ethnic Yao language of Yangwan, Malipo County, Yunnan

County-level divisions of Wenshan Prefecture